Freedom Fight / Open The Freedom Gate is a series of professional wrestling pay-per-view (PPV) events produced by Dragon Gate USA.

Background

Freedom Fight will feature an undetermined number of professional wrestling matches that will involve different wrestlers from pre-existing scripted feuds and storylines. Wrestlers will be portrayed as either villains or heroes in the scripted events that build tension and culminate into a wrestling match or series of matches.

The main emphasis on this show is to inaugurate the company's title, the Open the Freedom Gate Championship. There will be a 14-man tournament featuring four qualifying matches before leading to a final, which will be contested as a four-way elimination match between the winners. The first qualifier announced was a three-way match between Mike Quackenbush, Super Crazy, and Cima in a match billed as a "salute" to the trainer of all three men, Jorge Rivera. It was later announced Rivera was added to the match, making it a four-way. Proceeding this was the announcement of two singles matches being entitled, "Next Level" and "Redemption". The former will be pitting Davey Richards against one-half of the Open the Twin Gate Champions Yamato. The other singles match was announced on November 3 to be Brian Kendrick versus BxB Hulk. There was also a six-way match announced with the first two competitors for the match being named as Nick and Matt Jackson. The final four participants were announced on November 3, giving the match a theme, "Generation New", as it highlights younger wrestlers. The names announced were: Jigsaw, Johnny Gargano, Lince Dorado, and Gran Akuma.

Following their previous two encounters at Enter the Dragon and Untouchable, Dragon Kid and Masato Yoshino have developed a rivalry to determine who is the better competitor. With Dragon Kid winning both times, a frustrated Yoshino confronted his rival at the latter show, which also drew Yoshino's tag team partner Naruki Doi (the two together are known as Speed Muscle) into the conflict, as well as Shingo Takagi coming to the aid of Dragon Kid. This prompted the company to sign a tag team match featuring both parties at this show.

Results

2010

2011

References

External links
DGUSA.tv

Dragon Gate USA shows
2011 in professional wrestling
2010 in professional wrestling
Professional wrestling in New Jersey
Events in Philadelphia
Events in New Jersey
2010 in Philadelphia
Professional wrestling in Philadelphia
2011 in New Jersey